Seama may refer to:
 Seama, California
 Seama, New Mexico